Mutlu Dervişoğlu (born November 6, 1977) is a retired Turkish football player and is currently the assistant manager of Akhisar Belediyespor.

He played either as an attacking midfielder or as a striker. He played in Turkish Super League several seasons with Erzurumspor, Adanaspor, and Yimpaş Yozgatspor. His best season was his debut season as a professional player, when he scored 28 goals in 32 games in TFF Third League for Gümüşhanespor. That was a huge achievement given that he started playing football only when he was 17 years old. Until then, he was a basketball player playing for the local İdmanocağı basketball team. In 1994, he shifted to amateur football team of İdmanocağı. Without doubt his jumping and timing skills as a basketball player helped him to become a powerhouse forward in football. He is a native of Akçaabat and speaks English besides his native language.

External links
Profile at Turkish Football Federation
Coach profile at TFF

1977 births
Living people
Turkish footballers
Erzurumspor footballers
Akçaabat Sebatspor footballers
Adanaspor footballers
People from Akçaabat
Association football midfielders
Association football forwards